Aleksandr Yuryevich Kobzev (born 4 May 1989) is a Russian professional football player. He plays for FC Metallurg Lipetsk.

Club career
He made his Russian Football National League debut for FC Fakel Voronezh on 19 November 2016 in a game against FC Tosno.

He played in the 2017–18 Russian Cup final for FC Avangard Kursk on 9 May 2018 in the Volgograd Arena against 2-1 winners FC Tosno.

Honours
 Russian Professional Football League Zone Center Best Player: 2015–16.

References

External links
 Career summary by sportbox.ru  
 

1989 births
Sportspeople from Lipetsk
Living people
Russian footballers
Association football goalkeepers
FC Metallurg Lipetsk players
FC Fakel Voronezh players
FC Rotor Volgograd players
FC Mordovia Saransk players
FC Avangard Kursk players
FC KAMAZ Naberezhnye Chelny players